Rishi Raj Kapoor (4 September 1952 – 30 April 2020) was an Indian actor, film director and producer who worked in Hindi films. He was the recipient of several accolades, including four Filmfare Awards and a National Film Award.

Born into the Kapoor family, he made his debut, as an adolescent, in his father Raj Kapoor's film Mera Naam Joker (1970), for which he won the National Film Award for Best Child Artist. As an adult, his first lead role was opposite Dimple Kapadia in the teen romance Bobby (1973), which won him the Filmfare Award for Best Actor. Between 1973 and 2000, Kapoor starred as the romantic lead in 92 films. Some of his notable films during this period include Khel Khel Mein (1975), Kabhi Kabhie (1976), Sargam (1979), Karz (1980), Prem Rog (1982), Chandni (1989), and Deewana (1992).

Since the 2000s, Kapoor played character roles to critical acclaim in such films as Luck by Chance (2009), Love Aaj Kal (2009), Do Dooni Chaar (2010), Agneepath (2012), 102 Not Out (2018) and Mulk (2018). For his performance in Do Dooni Chaar (2010), he won the Filmfare Award for Best Actor (Critics), and for his role in Kapoor & Sons (2016), he won the Filmfare Award for Best Supporting Actor. He was honoured with the Filmfare Lifetime Achievement Award in 2008. His final film appearance was in Sharmaji Namkeen (2022), which was released posthumously.

Kapoor met his wife, actress Neetu Kapoor while working in films on film set. Their union produced 2 children. He died of leukemia on 30 April 2020, aged 67.

Early life and family 

Kapoor was born on 4 September 1952 at his family's home, Raj Kapoor Bungalow, in Matunga, South Bombay, in the then Bombay State of India, into a Punjabi Hindu Khatri family of the Kapoor clan, originally from Peshawar, North West Frontier Province to parents Raj Kapoor and Krishna Malhotra. He attended Colonel Brown Cambridge School in Dehradun, Campion School in Bombay and Mayo College in Ajmer.

Being part of the Kapoor family, he was the second son of legendary actor-director Raj Kapoor and Krishna Raj Kapoor (née Malhotra). Likewise, his family encompasses a successful line of actors, including brothers, Randhir and Rajiv Kapoor; grandfather Prithviraj Kapoor; paternal granduncle Trilok Kapoor, maternal uncles Prem, Rajendra, and Narendra Nath, as well as Prem Chopra; paternal uncles Shashi Kapoor and Shammi Kapoor. Rishi Kapoor's two sisters, on the other hand, include late Ritu Nanda, who was an insurance agent, and Rima Jain. The actresses Karisma Kapoor and Kareena Kapoor, the actors Armaan Jain and Aadar Jain, and Nitasha Nanda and the businessman Nikhil Nanda are his nieces and nephews.

Career 

Around the age of three, Kapoor's first on-screen appearance was a cameo in his father Raj Kapoor's film Shree 420 (1955), where he would appear in the musical sequence of "Pyar Hua, Iqrar Hua Hai". Likewise, Raj Kapoor would direct the film that provided Rishi his debut role, the 1970 film Mera Naam Joker, in which the actor would portray the young version of the lead character (played by Raj Kapoor).

Rishi Kapoor's first leading role would come in adulthood, opposite Dimple Kapadia, in the 1973 film Bobby, also directed by his father. Bobby went on to become one of the decade's biggest hits in India, and earned Rishi Kapoor the Filmfare Best Actor Award. Regarding the film, he would say in a 2012 interview: "There was a misconception that the film was made to launch me as an actor. The film was actually made to pay the debts of Mera Naam Joker. Dad wanted to make a teenage love story and he did not have money to cast Rajesh Khanna in the film". Following Bobby (1973), he starred in several light-hearted comedies within that decade, including, among others: Rafoo Chakkar (1975), with Neetu Singh; Amar Akbar Anthony (1977), with Amitabh Bachchan; and Khel Khel Mein (1975) and Hum Kisise Kum Naheen (1977) with Zeenat Aman.

Kapoor worked with actress Neetu Singh for the first time in Zahreela Insaan (1974). The two would go on to share the screen in multiple projects, including Kabhi Kabhi (1976) and Doosra Aadmi (1976), and would eventually marry in 1980. In 1980, Kapoor starred along with Tina Munim in director Subhash Ghai's reincarnation thriller Karz (1980),  which went on to become a cult classic with popular music. In a role considered one of his best works, Kapoor played an idealistic Devdhar in the 1982 film Prem Rog, a film based on the concept of widow remarriage, co-starring Padmini Kolhapure. Another highlight of his career, was Saagar in 1985, directed by noted director Ramesh Sippy, which saw Kapoor reunite with Dimple Kapadia, 12 years after they made their debuts in Bobby. He appeared as the second lead in several multi-starrer films in the 1980s such as Naseeb (1981), Kaatilon Ke Kaatil (1981), Coolie (1983), Dosti Dushmani (1986), Ghar Ghar Ki Kahani (1988) and Gharana (1989). In the 1986 drama Ek Chadar Maili Si, adapted from Rajendra Singh Bedi's novel of the same name, Kapoor would play a man forced by customs to marry his widowed sister-in-law, played by Hema Malini.

In 1991, Kapoor starred along with Pakistani actress Zeba Bakhtiyar in Henna, a tale of love across national borders, which was envisioned by his father, Raj Kapoor, and directed by his elder brother Randhir Kapoor. Henna was India's submission for the Academy Award for Best Foreign Language Film. Kapoor also had a leading role in the 1993 film Damini, co-starring Meenakshi Seshadri and Sunny Deol, that went on to be considered a classic socially-oriented film. Between 1973 and 2000, Kapoor's other film roles (mainly as the romantic lead) include: Raaja (1975), Laila Majnu (1976), Sargam (1979), Bade Dil Wala (1983), Chandni (1989), Bol Radha Bol (1992), Deewana (1992) and Karobaar (2000). Kapoor debuted as a director in Aa Ab Laut Chalen (1999) which starred Rajesh Khanna, Akshaye Khanna and Aishwarya Rai. This remained his sole directorial venture.

Kapoor successfully transitioned to character acting in the mid-2000s, going on to appear in several supporting roles, such as in  Hum Tum (2004), Fanaa (2006), Namastey London (2007), and Love Aaj Kal (2009). In 2007, he appeared in the British English-language films Don't Stop Dreaming and Sambar Salsa. In the 2010s, he played diverse roles such as the villain in Agneepath (2012), Aurangzeb (2013) and Kaanchi (2014); in Student of the Year (2012), as a gay character; and in D–Day (2013), as real-life mobster Dawood Ibrahim. He appeared with his brother Randhir for the first time in the multi-starrer comedy Housefull 2 (2012). He won the Filmfare Critics Award for Best Actor for his role in Do Dooni Chaar (2010), playing a middle-aged father trying to buy his own car. He also bagged a Filmfare Best Supporting Actor Award for his work in Kapoor & Sons (2016). He also appeared in an action comedy movie Besharam (2013) along with his wife Neetu Kapoor and son Ranbir Kapoor.

After two decades, he had his on-screen reunion with actor Amitabh Bachchan in 102 Not Out (2018), in which the two play an old-aged father-son duo. In 2018, he appeared in the Netflix drama Rajma Chawal and was critically acclaimed for his portrayal of a Muslim in Mulk. In 2019, two films of Kapoor's were released: Jhootha Kahin Ka, a comedy-drama film directed by Smeep Kang; and The Body, co-starring Emraan Hashmi, a mystery-thriller written and directed by Jeethu Joseph. Released on 13 December 2019, The Body would be Kapoor's last film to be released in his lifetime.

At the time of his death on 30 April 2020, Hitesh Bhatia's Sharmaji Namkeen co-starring Juhi Chawla, was under production and a four-day schedule was pending at the time of Kapoor's death. Producer Honey Trehan on 8 May 2020 confirmed that the film will be released in theatres. In January 2021, it was reported that Paresh Rawal is going to complete Kapoor's unfinished portions of the film, and it was released on Prime Video on 31 March 2022.

Personal life 

Kapoor, married actress Neetu Singh, from New Delhi, also of Punjabi Khatri descent in 1980. The couple had two children— son, actor Ranbir Kapoor, and a daughter. Kapoor's autobiography Khullam Khulla: Rishi Kapoor Uncensored, was released on 15 January 2017. Kapoor wrote the book along with Meena Iyer, and the title was published under HarperCollins. 

Kapoor was known to make controversial socio-political comments. In March 2016, he criticized the Nehru–Gandhi family over naming of roads, buildings and national assets in the name of Gandhi and Nehru. In September 2017, he again took on the Gandhi family by slamming Rahul Gandhi over dynastic politics. In March 2020, he expressed anger and criticized the Indian Judiciary with the "Tareekh Pe Tareekh" dialogue of his film Damini over the delay in execution of the four perpetrators who were convicted in the Nirbhaya case due to loopholes in the laws.

Illness and death 
Kapoor was diagnosed with leukemia in 2018 and went to New York City for treatment. After successful treatment for a year, he returned to India on 26 September 2019.

However, he was admitted to Sir H. N. Reliance Foundation Hospital on 29 April 2020 owing to breathing difficulties. He died on 30 April 2020 at 8:45 AM IST from recurrence of leukemia. Kapoor's last rites were performed at Chandanwadi Crematorium and his ashes were immersed in Banganga.

Awards 

 1970 – National Film Award for Mera Naam Joker
1970 – Bengal Film Journalists' Association Awards: Special Award for Mera Naam Joker
 1974 – Filmfare Award for Best Actor for Bobby
 2008 – Filmfare Lifetime Achievement Award
 2009 – Honoured by Russian Government for contribution to cinema
 2010 – Producers Guild Film Award for Best Actor in a Supporting Role for Love Aaj Kal
 2010 – Screen Award for Best Supporting Actor for Love Aaj Kal
2011 – Filmfare Award for Best Actor (Critics) for Do Dooni Chaar
 2011 – Zee Cine Awards: Best Lifetime Jodi along with Neetu Singh
 2013 – The Times of India Film Awards (TOIFA), Best Actor in a Negative Role for Agneepath
 2017 – Filmfare Award for Best Supporting Actor for Kapoor & Sons
 2017 – Zee Cine Award for Best Actor in a Supporting Role – Male for Kapoor & Sons
 2017 – Zee Cine Award for Best Actor in a Comic Role for Kapoor & Sons
 2019 – Adidas Most Stylish Awards – Best Projected By Adidas

See also 

 List of Indian film actors
 List of Bollywood actors

References

External links 

 

Punjabi Hindus
1952 births
2020 deaths
20th-century Indian film directors
20th-century Indian male actors
21st-century Indian male actors
Best Child Artist National Film Award winners
Deaths from cancer in India
Deaths from leukemia
Film directors from Mumbai
Filmfare Awards winners
Filmfare Lifetime Achievement Award winners
Screen Awards winners
International Indian Film Academy Awards winners
Zee Cine Awards winners
Hindi-language film directors
Indian male child actors
Indian male film actors
Rishi
Male actors from Mumbai
Male actors in Hindi cinema
Punjabi people
Indian Hindus